Denim & Rhinestones is the ninth studio album by American country music singer Carrie Underwood. The album was released on June 10, 2022, through Capitol Records Nashville. The album was recorded throughout the years of 2021 and 2022, with production from David Garcia, who previously produced Cry Pretty (2018) and My Savior (2021), with co-production from Underwood as well. The album entered the top ten in the United States, and the top 40 in Scotland, Australia, and Canada. It failed to enter the UK Albums Chart, but entered at number one on the UK Country Albums chart.

The cover and release date for the album were first revealed on April 7, 2022. Underwood revealed the tracklist for the album through social media the following day. The album contains twelve tracks, eleven of which were co-written by Underwood.

Background
On March 18, Underwood first spoke about the atmosphere of the album, saying, "I feel like people are going to hear everything and [get] some warm fuzzies and hopefully it'll just make people happy to listen to. It's a very 'sing into your hairbrush, in your house, in your room' kind of album." She later elaborated, saying, "When I walked in to start making this album, it was like, what do you want to do? My co-producer and co-writer, David Garcia, was like, ‘What do you want to do?’ And I was like, ‘I just want to have fun.’”

In April, Underwood spoke about the album's title track, saying, "The song 'Denim & Rhinestones' is super fun, with a bit of a retro vibe – we just go together, like a sweet tea and a lemon, like denim and rhinestones. You have these things that are great on their own and then you put them together and they just fit. That's how this album feels."

When the album's trailer aired on April 8, Underwood said, "We cover a lot of ground on this album. We have a lot of songs that have a bit of a “throwback” feel, but they sound super fresh. I grew up listening to so many different kinds of music and that is extremely evident in this body of work. These are musical influences that are all in me and working their way out, and I just decided this time not to get in their way. I think this whole album ended up being a big reflection of me as a person and as an artist." When asked about lead single, "Ghost Story", Underwood praised songwriters Josh Kear, Hillary Lindsey, and David Garcia, saying, "They are such talented, amazing songwriters who know me so well. From the first time I heard it I knew I had to record it."

In September 2022, Underwood spoke more about the album, saying, “The great thing about music right now is, it's so accessible and people have so many favorites of all types, all genres. It's easier than ever now to just consume that music, whatever you're feeling for the day. For me as an artist, being influenced by so many different kinds of artists and genres of music — they work their way in anyway, and I feel like it's just getting easier not to fight it. I love country music obviously. But I feel like every once in a while, if there's some other flavors that get in there, it just kind of expands on my brand of country music. I mean, that's all different parts of me. I feel like with this album, I was able to kind of explore more sides of myself — musically and as a writer — all in one album. It's all random, but it all works together.”

Promotion
The lead single for the album, "Ghost Story", was released digitally on March 18, 2022. Underwood gave the debut performance of the single at the Grammy Awards on April 3, 2022. Underwood gave the second performance of "Ghost Story" at the 2022 CMT Music Awards, which aired on April 11.

The album's title track, "Denim & Rhinestones", was released on April 8, 2022, as its first promotional single, alongside an accompanying lyric video. Another promotional single, titled "Crazy Angels", was released on April 22, 2022.

Underwood performed the two promotional singles, as well as "Ghost Story", during her set at Stagecoach Festival on April 30.

A third promotional single, "She Don't Know", was made available to stream on May 20.

On June 9, Underwood performed a concert inside Nashville's historic Bell Tower, which included new songs from the album. On June 10, she performed two new songs on Good Morning America. During the week of the 2022 CMA Music Festival, a pop-up exhibit called The Denim & Rhinestones Experience opened to the public. The exhibit features "interactive photo installations, wardrobe displays, and a retail boutique celebrating the music of Denim & Rhinestones." On June 11, Underwood was the closing headliner for CMA Music Fest, with approximately 64,000 in attendance.

On June 14, she performed "Pink Champagne" on The Tonight Show. At the end of June, Underwood made multiple appearances in London to promote the album, including appearing on Lorraine. The track "Pink Champagne" was released as a promotional single in Australia.

On August 19 and 20, she performed four shows at the Grand Ole Opry and included new songs, including "Ghost Story", "Velvet Heartbreak", "Hate My Heart", and "Burn". She included new songs during her set at the Iowa State Fair on August 21, with 14,000 in attendance.

On September 29, Underwood partnered with iHeartRadio to perform an hour-long concert that included new songs. In November, she appeared at the American Music Awards, performing “Crazy Angels” in an aerial cage.

Singles
“Ghost Story” served as lead single for the album, released in March 2022, and peaking at No. 6 on Billboard’s Country Airplay in the fall, becoming Underwood's thirtieth top ten hit.

The album's second single, “Hate My Heart”, impacted country radio on October 31, 2022.

Tour
On May 16, 2022, Underwood announced the Denim & Rhinestones Tour with special guest Jimmie Allen. The tour began on October 15, 2022, in Greenville, South Carolina and concluded on March 17, 2023, in Seattle, Washington.

Critical reception
Upon release, the album received generally positive reviews. Stephen Thomas Erlewine of AllMusic awarded it 4 stars and wrote, "It's a record where the shining surfaces are buffed so brilliantly, they're blinding. Such extravagance suits Underwood, who continues to demonstrate a masterly sense of control as a vocalist, able to milk the melodrama out of power ballads while also sounding defiant on arena-fillers and seeming convincingly tender on the sweeter melodies. Despite this gift, the best moments on Denim & Rhinestones are the ones that contain no subtlety: the overdriven '80s-MTV inflections of "Crazy Angels," the insistent taunt of the chorus on "Hate My Heart," the bubbly exuberance of "Pink Champagne," the exaggerated retro-chill vibe on "Wanted Woman," and the high-'80s throwback spirit of "Denim & Rhinestones." The Toronto Sun wrote "And after selling 66 million albums and winning more than 100 major awards, Underwood bounces through a mix of synth-pop, soul, rootsy country and roadhouse blues for a 12-song set that pulsates with real joy.”  Entertainment Focus awarded the album 4.5 stars and wrote, "Denim & Rhinestones isn't taking itself seriously; sometimes we just need to shake off a bad relationship, grab our pals and head out for a good time", also adding, "Standout songs on the album are the home-based ballad ‘Burn’, the warning-song of ‘Poor Everybody Else’ and 'Wanted Woman', for the western-reference title and the upbeat electronic dance direction."

Outsider gave a positive take, writing "Denim & Rhinestones is like Carnival Ride or Some Hearts, but matured like a fine wine. Truly, the beginning of a sparkly, shiny, bedazzled era for Carrie Underwood and fans alike." Riff Magazine gave a positive review, writing, "She’s stated the purpose of the album is to have fun, and she’s having plenty of it. If the album's lyrics weren't so country themselves, the album would actually tread the line of rock and roll." The Nash News gave a positive review, saying, "Denim & Rhinestones seems to bring together all of Underwood's favorite influences: rhythmic pop, rock 'n'roll, and down-home country."

Commercial performance
Denim & Rhinestones debuted at number 10 on the US Billboard 200, earning 31,000 album-equivalent units, including 22,000 pure album sales; it debuted at number 2 on the Top Country Albums. It marked Underwood's tenth Top 10 album on the Billboard 200 chart and tenth Top 3 Billboard Country album.

Awards and nominations 
50th American Music Awards

|-
| style="text-align:center;"|2022 || style="text-align:center;"| Denim & Rhinestones || style="text-align:center;"| Favorite Album - Country || 
|-

Track listing

Personnel
Musicians

 Carrie Underwood – lead vocals, background vocals
 David Garcia – electric guitar, programming, keyboards (1, 3–7, 9), acoustic guitar (2, 5, 6, 8, 12), bass guitar (5, 7, 8), mandolin (6, 7), ganjo (8), dobro (8)
 Dave Cohen – keyboards, programming (5)
 Ilya Toshinsky – acoustic guitar, mandolin (2, 3, 6, 7, 11), electric guitar (5, 7), ganjo (8), dobro (8)
 Jimmie Lee Sloas – bass guitar
 Aaron Sterling – drums (1, 8), percussion (1, 8)
 Derek Wells – electric guitar
 Rob McNelley – electric guitar (1–4, 6, 7, 10–12)
 Bryan Sutton – acoustic guitar (2, 5, 12), dobro (12)
 Hillary Lindsey – background vocals (2–4, 11)
 Jerry Roe – drums (2–7, 10, 11), percussion (10, 11)
 Alex Wright – keyboards (3, 5)
 Sol Philcox-Littlefield – electric guitar (5, 9, 10, 12)
 Fred Eltringham – drums (9, 12)
 Chris DeStefano – background vocals (10)
 Charlie Worsham – acoustic guitar (11)
 Stuart Duncan – fiddle (11)

Technical

 Joe LaPorta – mastering
 Serban Ghenea – mixing, engineering (1, 8)
 F. Reid Shippen – mixing, engineering (2, 11)
 Justin Niebank – mixing, engineering (3)
 Jim Cooley – mixing, engineering (4–6, 10)
 Dave Clauss – mixing, engineering (7, 9, 12)
 David Garcia – engineering, editing
 Jeff Balding – engineering
 Kam Luchterhand – engineering
 Bryan David Willis – editing
 Trey Keller – editing
 Drew Bollman – additional mixing (3)
 Bryce Bordone – additional engineering, mixing assistance (1, 8)
 Brandon Towles – additional engineering, mixing assistance (2, 11)
 Zach Kuhlman – additional engineering, mixing assistance (4–6, 10)
 Michael Walter – engineering assistance

Charts

Weekly charts

Year-end charts

References

2022 albums
Carrie Underwood albums
Capitol Records Nashville albums
Universal Music Group albums